Lee Jong-chan  (born 26 May 1987) is a South Korean footballer who plays as a defender.

External links 

1987 births
Living people
Association football defenders
South Korean footballers
Jeju United FC players
Daejeon Hana Citizen FC players
Gimcheon Sangmu FC players
K League 1 players